"Power and the Glory" (sometimes titled "The Power and the Glory") is an American patriotic song by Phil Ochs, a U.S. protest singer from the 1960s known for being a harsh critic of the American military and industrial establishment. Originally released on his 1964 debut album, All the News That's Fit to Sing, "Power and the Glory" is said to have contributed to Ochs' profound impact.

History
Singer/songwriter Phil Ochs is said to have "spent half his adult life dodging FBI microphones hidden in his soup." By 1963, Ochs was not well thought of by the U.S. government and was deemed one of the harshest critics of the American military and industrial establishment. In that same year, Ochs began writing "Power and the Glory," a song that honors the way of life that America symbolized to the world. While composing the song, Ochs told his sister Sonny that he was writing "the greatest song I'll ever write".

The song has been described as an "anthem ... with lyrics that might have been written by the great Woody Guthrie". Said to be the American patriotic hymn best at combining the American dream with selfless Christian ideals"Power and the Glory" consists of three verses, each followed by a chorus. The first verse invites the listener to walk with the singer, and it describes some of the natural wonders of the United States. The second verse names some of the states through which the listener and the singer would travel. The third verse notes that the United States is "only as rich as the poorest of the poor" but also as "strong as our love for this land". The chorus of "Power and the Glory" describes the United States as "a land full of power and glory":

A fourth verse, not added to the final production release, but found in a bootleg demo recording and confirmed by Ochs' sister Sonny, contains a call to action:

Legacy
"Power and the Glory" is said to have contributed to Ochs' profound impact. "Power and the Glory" also has been covered by many performers, including Theodore Bikel, Anita Bryant, Ronnie Gilbert, Pete Seeger, The Limeliters, Clem Tholet, and the U.S. Army Soldiers Chorus. Ochs, who was a leftist, was particularly amused by Bryant's cover because of her right-wing political views. In 1974 Ochs re-recorded the song in a new arrangement, with a fife and drum accompaniment, that was influenced by Bryant's version. Ochs' 1974 version was released as a single. In 2018, Billy Bragg wrote that "Power and the Glory" "should be sung in schools across America".

References

External links

1963 songs
1974 singles
American patriotic songs
Phil Ochs songs
Songs written by Phil Ochs
Pete Seeger songs
Song recordings produced by Jac Holzman
A&M Records singles